Good Hope is an unincorporated village in, and the seat of, Wayne Township, Fayette County, Ohio, United States.

History

Good Hope was platted in 1849, although a small village had already existed there for some time. The community is said to have derived its name from Good Hope, Pennsylvania, the native home of a share of the early settlers.  A post office was established at Good Hope in 1851, and remained in operation until 1965.

It was only in 2012 that Good Hope had a waste treatment plant.

Geography
Good Hope lies at the intersection of State Route 753 with Washington-Good Hope and Camp Grove Roads. It is located midway between Greenfield and Washington Court House, the county seat of Fayette County.

Demographics
In 1980 or later, the United States Census Bureau incorporated Good Hope within one of its census-designated places (CDPs) for demographic statistical purposes. Therefore, census-based demographic data for Good Hope actually applies to the entire CDP, not just the village.

As of the 2010 census the CDP population was 234.

References

Census-designated places in Fayette County, Ohio
Census-designated places in Ohio